The Hits Album 2 or Hits 2 as it is often called, is a compilation album that was released in April 1985 in the UK. The spine of the album as well as the inside cover lists the title as HITS 2 THE ALBUM. It was released by CBS and WEA. It reached #1 in the UK Top 100 Album Chart for 6 weeks. Selected tracks from this and the first album were released on VHS and Betamax by CBS/FOX Video, under the title The Hits Video.

Hits 2 features four songs which reached number one on the UK Singles Chart: "You Spin Me Round (Like a Record)", "Easy Lover", "I Want To Know What Love Is" and "I Should Have Known Better".

Track listing
Record/Tape 1 Side 1 (1)
 Dead or Alive – "You Spin Me Round (Like a Record)"
 Howard Jones – "Things Can Only Get Better"
 King – "Love & Pride"
 Nik Kershaw – "Wide Boy"
 New Edition – "Mr. Telephone Man"
 Kirsty MacColl – "A New England"
 Strawberry Switchblade – "Since Yesterday"

Record/Tape 1 Side 2 (2)
 Prince – "1999"
 Philip Bailey and Phil Collins – "Easy Lover"
 Ashford & Simpson – "Solid"
 Chaka Khan – "This Is My Night"
 James Ingram and Michael McDonald – "Yah Mo B There"
 Dazz Band – "Let It All Blow"
 Art of Noise – "Close (to the Edit)"

Record/Tape 2 Side 1 (3)
 Foreigner – "I Want to Know What Love Is"
 Paul Young – "Everything Must Change"
 Chicago – "You're the Inspiration"
 Jim Diamond – "I Should Have Known Better"
 Amii Stewart – "Friends"
 The Commodores – "Nightshift"
 Alison Moyet – "That Ole Devil Called Love"

Record/Tape 2 Side 2 (4)
 Stephen "Tin Tin" Duffy – "Kiss Me"
 Little Benny & the Masters – "Who Comes to Boogie"
 Matt Bianco – "More Than I Can Bear"
 Big Sound Authority – "This House (Is Where Love Stands)"
 ZZ Top – "Legs"
 Mick Jagger – "Just Another Night"
 Shakin' Stevens – "Breaking Up My Heart"

Video selection
 Dead or Alive – "You Spin Me Round (Like a Record)"
 Howard Jones – "Things Can Only Get Better"
 King – "Love & Pride"
 Nik Kershaw – "Wide Boy"
 Shakin' Stevens – "Breaking Up My Heart"
 Wham! – "Everything She Wants"†
 Strawberry Switchblade – "Since Yesterday"
 Paul Young – "Everything Must Change"
 Alison Moyet – "That Ole Devil Called Love"
 Matt Bianco – "More Than I Can Bear"
 Big Sound Authority – "This House (Is Where Your Love Stands)"
 New Edition – "Mr. Telephone Man"
 The S.O.S. Band – "Just Be Good to Me"††
 Miami Sound Machine – "Dr. Beat"††
 Billy Ocean – "Loverboy"†
 Sade – "Smooth Operator"††
 George Michael – "Careless Whisper"††
 Associates – "Breakfast"†
 Echo & the Bunnymen – "The Killing Moon"†
 The Stranglers – "Skin Deep"††
 Everything but the Girl – "Each and Every One"††
 The Monochrome Set – "Jacob's Ladder"†
 The Sisters of Mercy – "No Time to Cry"†

† Never appeared on any Hits album.

†† Previously appeared on Hits 1.

References 
Collins Complete UK Hit Albums 1956-2005. Graham Betts. 2005. .

1985 compilation albums
CBS Records compilation albums
Warner Music Group compilation albums
Hits (compilation series) albums